Brauneis is a surname of German origin closely related to Braun and Bruhn, all indicating a dark complexion.

Notable people with this surname include:

Daniel Brauneis (born 1986), Austrian footballer 
Jean-Chrysostome Brauneis I (1785-1832), Canadian composer, bandmaster, and music educator of German birth
Jean-Chrysostome Brauneis II (1814-1871), Canadian composer, organist, and music educator
Robert Brauneis, law professor whose research led to the removal of a copyright claim for the song Happy Birthday to You

References

Surnames of German origin